Lawrence C. Mohr Jr.  was the Physician to the President to Ronald Reagan and George H. W. Bush. As Physician to the President, from 1989 onwards, he served concurrently with Burton J. Lee III, who was picked by Bush. Mohr was an advocate for medical transparency from the White House, stating, "The American people are entitled to know the health status of their president and presidential candidates."

In 2016, Mohr suffered a spinal cord injury, which left him paralyzed. He underwent physical therapy at Shepherd Center.

References
Notes

Citations

Physicians to the President